The Office of Consumer Affairs (OCA) is a Government of Canada agency under Innovation, Science and Economic Development Canada, which is responsible for consumer protection and promotion. The OCA is mandated "to these responsibilities by building trust in the marketplace so that consumers can both protect themselves and be able to confidently and knowledgeably drive demand for innovative products and services at competitive prices".

References

External links 
 Office of Consumer Affairs website

Federal departments and agencies of Canada
Innovation, Science and Economic Development Canada
Consumer rights agencies